Cyphicerini is a tribe of oriental broad-nosed weevils in the subfamily of beetles known as Entiminae.

Genera
These 134 genera belong to the tribe Cyphicerini:

 Acanthotrachelus Schoenherr, 1842 c g
 Afrodolius Marshall, 1946 c g
 Afrophytoscaphus Hustache, 1936 c g
 Agrostes Marshall, 1944 c g
 Allaeoptochus Kojima & Morimoto, 2006 c g
 Altonomus Desbrochers des Loges, 1907 c g
 Amblyrhinus Schoenherr, 1826 c g
 Amrikus Pajni & Sidhu, 1982 c g
 Amyllocerus Kojima & Morimoto, 2006 c g
 Anosimus Roelofs, 1873 c g
 Aphytoscaphus Hustache, 1947 c g
 Arhines Schoenherr, 1834 c g
 Aspidomycter Marshall, 1943 c g
 Asporus Marshall, 1944 c g
 Asynetus Marshall, 1944 c g
 Atmesia Pascoe, 1870 c g
 Baryconorrhinus Voss, 1959 c g
 Baryrrhinus Marshall, 1944 c g
 Breviepistomus Pajni, Sidhu & Kumar, 1987 c g
 Calomycterus Roelofs, 1873 i c g b
 Canoixus Roelofs, 1873 c g
 Cephaloptochus Bajtenov, 1974 c g
 Chloebius Schoenherr, 1826 c g
 Cnaphoscapus Marshall, 1944 c g
 Cnodostethus Marshall, 1944 c g
 Corigetus Desbrochers des Loges, 1872 c g
 Corymacronus Kojima & Morimoto, 2006 c g
 Crinorrhinus Marshall, 1941 c g
 Cyllomerus Marshall, 1954 c g
 Cyphicerinus Marshall, 1928 c g
 Cyphicerus Schoenherr, 1823 c g
 Cyrtepistomus Marshall, 1913 i c g b
 Deiradorrhinus Marshall, 1941 c g
 Diatropus Marshall, 1944 c g
 Doliophron Marshall, 1941 c g
 Drymophoetus Marshall, 1944 c g
 Echinomyllocerus Yoro & Kojima, 2017 c
 Ecmyllocerus Zimmerman, 1994 c g
 Emperorrhinus Marshall, 1916 c g
 Epicalus Motschulsky, 1858 c g
 Epilasius Faust, 1894 c g
 Episomoides Kôno, 1930 c g
 Epius Marshall, 1948 c g
 Epixynus Marshall, 1944 c g
 Eryngus Marshall, 1948 c g
 Eumyllocerus Sharp, 1896 c g
 Euphalia Pascoe, 1870 c g
 Eusomidius Faust, 1885 c g
 Gobinda Pajni, Sidhu & Kumar, 1987 c g
 Gyratogaster Daniel & Daniel, 1903 c g
 Hackeria Lea, 1911 c g
 Hamartus Marshall, 1944 c g
 Hemerus Marshall, 1944 c g
 Heteroptochus Faust, 1886 c g
 Hilaus Marshall, 1944 c g
 Himachala Pajni, 1990 c g
 Hirsutopes Pajni, 1990 c g
 Holorrhynchus Marshall, 1916 c g
 Howeocis Lea, 1926 c g
 Hypenephorus Marshall, 1944 c g
 Hyperstylus Roelofs, 1873 c g
 Indophytoscaphus Pajni & Sidhu, 1982 c g
 Iranorrhinus Voss, 1959	 c g
 Kairakia Nasreddinov, 1986 c g
 Konomycterus Kojima & Morimoto, 2006	 c g
 Lagenolobus Faust, 1887 c g
 Leianisorhynchus Pic, 1905 c g
 Lepidepistomodes Kojima & Morimoto, 2006 c g
 Lepidepistomus Kojima & Morimoto, 2006 c g
 Macrocorynus Schoenherr, 1823	 c g
 Marshalla Pajni, 1990 c g
 Matesia Lea, 1904 c g
 Meionops Marshall, 1917 c g
 Myllocerinus Reitter, 1900 c g
 Mylloceropsis Aurivillius, 1910	 c g
 Myllocerus Schönherr, 1823 i c g b
 Myosides Roelofs, 1873 c g b
 Neomyllocerus Voss, 1934 c g
 Neophytoscaphus Hustache, 1935 c g
 Neoptochus Horn, 1876 i c g b
 Nirala Pajni, Sidhu & Kumar, 1988 c g
 Nothomyllocerus Kojima & Morimoto, 2006 c g
 Oedophrys Marshall, 1941 c g
 Onychophyllobius Schilsky, 1908 c g
 Oophthalmus Marshall, 1943 c g
 Orchobius Marshall, 1944 c g
 Ortholcus Marshall, 1944 c g
 Oxyophthalmus Hochhuth, 1847 c g
 Paramycter Marshall, 1944 c g
 Parapoteriothorax Ter-Minasian & Nasreddinov, 1978 c g
 Parascaphus Marshall, 1944 c g
 Paratitinia Zimmerman & Oberprieler, 2014 c g
 Paurommatus Marshall, 1944 c g
 Peltotrachelus Marshall, 1917 c g
 Peranosimus Voss, 1943 c g
 Peronaspis Suvorov, 1915 c g
 Phaylomerinthus Schoenherr, 1842 c g
 Pholicerus Marshall, 1944 c g
 Phrixopogon Marshall, 1941 c g
 Phylladobius Marshall, 1944 c g
 Phyllolytus Fairmaire, 1889 c g
 Phytoscaphus Schoenherr, 1826 c g
 Piezophrys Marshall, 1944 c g
 Platymycterus Marshall, 1918 c g
 Platytrachelus Schoenherr, 1842 c g
 Pollendera Motschulsky, 1858 c g
 Poteriothorax Ter-Minasian, 1973 c g
 Prolobothrix Voss, 1967 c g
 Pseudobarirrhinus Magnano, 2009 c g
 Pseudoedophrys Kojima & Morimoto, 2006 c g b
 Pseudomyllocerinus Voss, 1959 c g
 Pseudoparascaphus Magnano, 2009 c g
 Psidiopsis Pascoe, 1872 c g
 Ptochella Reitter, 1906 c g
 Ptochus Schoenherr, 1826 c g
 Rhicnostomus Marshall, 1944 c g
 Rhinospineus Hoffmann, 1961 c g
 Robertoides Ramamurthy & Ghai, 1987 c g
 Salbachia Reitter, 1906 c g
 Scaeorrhinus Marshall, 1944 c g
 Sematia Zimmerman, 1994 c g
 Sphaeroptochus Egorov & Zherikhin, 1991 c g
 Stelorrhinus Marshall, 1916 c g
 Synomus Pascoe, 1885 c g
 Syrphax Marshall, 1944 c g
 Tanyscapus Marshall, 1944 c g
 Taractor Pajni, 1990 c g
 Telenica Pascoe, 1872 c g
 Thalponomus Marshall, 1944 c g
 Thlipsomerus Marshall, 1944 c g
 Thyraulus Marshall, 1944 c g
 Tolmesis Faust, 1897 c g
 Transptochus Pajni, Sidhu & Kumar, 1989 c g
 Trapezauchen Marshall, 1944 c g

Data sources: i = ITIS, c = Catalogue of Life, g = GBIF, b = Bugguide.net

References

 Lacordaire, T. 1863: Histoire Naturelle des Insectes. Genera des Coléoptères ou exposé méthodique et critique de tous les genres proposés jusqu'ici dans cet ordre d'insectes. Vol.: 6. Roret. Paris: 637 pp.
 Alonso-Zarazaga, M.A.; Lyal, C.H.C. 1999: A world catalogue of families and genera of Curculionoidea (Insecta: Coleoptera) (excepting Scolytidae and Platypodidae). Entomopraxis, Barcelona

External links 

Entiminae